Anita Nemtin (born 5 December 1969) is a Hungarian equestrian. She competed in the individual eventing at the 1996 Summer Olympics.

References

External links
 

1969 births
Living people
Hungarian female equestrians
Olympic equestrians of Hungary
Equestrians at the 1996 Summer Olympics
Sportspeople from Montreal